Sinjil is a Palestinian town northeast of Ramallah in the Ramallah and al-Bireh Governorate in the central West Bank.

Location
It is bordered by Turmus ayya to the east,  Al Lubban ash Sharqiya to the north, 'Abwein and Jilijliya  to the west, and Al Mazra'a ash Sharqiya to the south. Sinjil is located in the Ramallah and al-Bireh Governorate of the West Bank.

History
Sherds from the  Intermediate Bronze Age, Bronze Age, Byzantine, Crusader/Ayyubid and Mamluk eras have been found. Tombs at Sinjil from the Middle Bronze Age have yielded an array of metal weapons.

The village is thought to have taken its name from the Crusader town of St. Gilles, being the home town of French Count Raymond VI of Toulouse who camped here on the First Crusade, before entering Jerusalem. The same man later built a castle in Sinjil to protect the passage of passing caravans. 

Doubt over the Crusader origin of the name was raised by historian Levy-Rubin. A Samaritan chronicle, (ostensibly by Abu l-Fath), written in the 14th century but based on much older sources, twice refers to a location Sinḥil in the 8th or 9th century. The Arab geographer Zakariya al-Qazwini in his Athar al-bilad cited a 10th-century mention of Sinḥil, though this cannot be verified from extant manuscripts. Levy-Rubin proposes that Sinḥil was the original name of Sinjil, and that the Crusaders' association of the place with St Gilles was prompted by the Arab name rather than the reverse.

In the 1220s Yaqut al-Hamawi described Sinjil as "a small town of the province Filastin. Near it is the pit of Yasuf as Sadik (Joseph)".

Crusader church (present mosque)
The village paid ecclesiastical tithes to the Church of the Holy Sepulchre in Jerusalem while a Frankish parish, until they were transferred in 1145 to the monastery on Mount Tabor.

Only thirty years later, in 1175, the parish church and tithes were sold back to the Church of the Holy Sepulchre, as the distance (from Mount Tabor) and expenses were too high. A month later the sale was confirmed by Baldwin, lord of Sinjil.

Ottoman era
In 1517 the village was incorporated into the Ottoman Empire with the rest of Palestine. In 1596 it appeared in the tax registers as being in the Nahiya of Quds of the Liwa of Quds. It had a population of 55 households, all Muslim, and paid  a fixed tax rate of 33,3%  on wheat, barley, vineyards, fruit trees, goats and beehives; a total of 9,900 akçe. The Turkish traveler Evliya Çelebi visited Sinjil about 1650. He described it as a village of 200 houses in the district of Jerusalem, populated by rebellious Muslims.

During the early 19th century, Sinjil was a village of 206 taxable men, roughly 800 people. One-eighth of the population were conscripted into the Ottoman army, but were still taxed for 800 people.

French explorer Victor Guérin visited the village in 1870, and described it as "quite crowded", with an estimated 1200 villagers. The village had two abundant springs, with a reservoir connected to the largest. Guérin further noted, "On the summit of the hill are observed the foundations of two strongholds, built of great blocks, evidently ancient, one of which is called the Kasr ("Fort"), and the other the Keniseh ("Church"). The latter is [] built east and west, and may have been a church. On the lower flanks of the hill I found several ancient tombs cut in the rock. One of the largest, preceded by a vestibule, contains two loculi." An Ottoman village list of about the same year, 1870, showed that "Sindschil" had 161 houses and a population of 513, though the population count included only men.

In 1882, the PEF's Survey of Western Palestine  described Sinjil as being of moderate size, with several houses of two storeys, on a hill side with fine fig gardens below.

The village mosque is laid out on the lines of the Frankish Crusader church. Other historical sites in the town include a well for Joseph and a holy site for Jacob. The Maqam (shrine) of a holy man, Abu Auf, is also there. Abu Auf is from the time period of the Caliph Umar Ibn al-Khattab.

In 1896 the population of Sinjil was estimated to be about 1,131 persons.

British Mandate era
In the 1922 census of Palestine conducted by the British Mandate authorities, Sinjil (called: Senjel) had an entirely Muslim population of 934, while in the 1931 census, the village had 266 occupied houses and a population of 1071, still all Muslims.

In the 1945 statistics the population was 1,320 Muslims while the total land area was 14,186 dunams, according to an official land and population survey. Of this, 4,169 were allocated for plantations and irrigable land, 4,213 for cereals, while 47 dunams were classified as built-up (urban) areas.

Jordanian era
In the wake of the 1948 Arab–Israeli War, and after the 1949 Armistice Agreements, Sinjil came under Jordanian rule. It was annexed by Jordan in 1950.

In 1961, the population of Sinjil was  1,778 persons.

post-1967
Since the Six-Day War in 1967, Sinjil has been under Israeli occupation. The population of Singil in the 1967 census conducted by the Israeli authorities was 1,823, of whom 18 originated from the Israeli territory.

Under the Oslo Accords of 1995, 13.8% of village land was classified as Area A, 34.7% as Area B, while the remaining 51.5% is  Area C. Israel has confiscated 447 dunams of Sinjil land in order to construct the Israeli settlement of Ma'ale Levona. In addition 4 outposts, including Givat Harel, have been established on Sinjil land.

On Wednesday 7 April 2015 a 32-year-old resident of Sinjil was shot dead carrying out a knife attack at Shiloh junction which left two army paramedics injured, one seriously.

Urban development
Since 2002, according to Amira Hass, Jewish settlers have hampered villagers' access to their traditional lands. In 2009, the Red Cross has helped the villagers to overcome the red-tape that blocks their return to their farms. An agreement was reached to allow them to access some of the land, some 100 hectares, in July 2012. Given problems with the nearby settlers, the villagers had to coordinate with the Israeli Civil Administration and the Israeli forces to have an escort. In January 2012, the United States Agency for International Development financed road work and renovations of the Abu Bakr as-Saddeeq boys' school in Sinjil.

Demography
According to the Palestinian Central Bureau of Statistics, the town had a population of approximately 5,236 in 2007. The gender makeup consisted of 2,668 males and 2,568 females. There were 1,029 housing units and the average household size was 5.4.

Literary references
In 2007, Aziz Shihab whose family was from Sinjil, wrote a memoir of his journey to the village Does the Land Remember Me? (2007)

His daughter, Naomi Shihab Nye, who stayed there in 1966, aged 14, and recalls her sojourn as having a formative influence on her poetics.

References

Bibliography

  

  
 

 

 
  
 

 p. 95

External links
 Welcome to Sinjil
 Sinjil, Welcome to Palestine
Survey of Western Palestine, Map 14: IAA, Wikimedia commons
Sinjil Town (Fact Sheet),   Applied Research Institute–Jerusalem (ARIJ)
Sinjil Town Profile, ARIJ
Sinjil  aerial photo, ARIJ
Locality Development Priorities and Needs in Sinjil Town, ARIJ
Chopping 51 Olive Trees in Sinjil – Ramallah Governorate 25, June, 2011, ARIJ
Plowing in Sinjil

Towns in the West Bank
Municipalities of the State of Palestine